The Šahovići massacre was a massacre of the Muslim population of the Yugoslav village of Šahovići (modern-day Tomaševo in Montenegro) and neighbouring villages in the region of the Lower Kolašin. It was committed on 9 and 10 November 1924 by a mob of 2,000 Orthodox Christian men from Kolašin and Bijelo Polje that sought revenge for the earlier murder of Boško Bošković, governor of the area. The massacre was fueled by rumors which targeted local Muslims, anti-Yugoslav leader Jusuf Mehonjić (in Albanan: Isuf Mehani) as the perpetrator. In time, it became known that Bošković was killed by members of a rival clan, the Rovčani. In the aftermath of the massacre many Muslims fled from the region.

Background

The motive for the massacre was the murder of Boško Bošković, the chief of the Kolašin county. Bošković was murdered in an ambush by unknown assailants on 7 November 1924, while he travelled from Mojkovac to Šahovići. In this period, in much of Lower Kolašin a group of anti-Yugoslav rebels were active. Their leader was Jusuf Mehonjić (also known as Isuf Mehani), a Kachak and member of the Committee for the National Defence of Kosovo from Šahovići. The local Montenegrin authorities singled out Jusuf Mejonjić, despite him being in Albania at the time of the murder, and the population of Šahovići as having been active in Bošković's murder and an order was issued on the same day to confiscate all weapons in possession of the population of Šahovići and Pavino Polje. Bošković was buried on 9 November 1924. In the speeches held during his funeral, the Orthodox population of Šahovići accused the Muslim population of Šahovići for his death. Adil Zulfikarpašić emphasizes that Šahovići and Pavino Polje had been disarmed two days before the massacre. Local authorities arrested 31 men from Šahovići on 7 November 1924. After the events of the massacre, it emerged that the murderers of Bošković were clan members from Rovca, a rival tribe to his own.

Massacre

Zulfikarpašić concluded that the massacre was committed by armed men from Kolašin and Bijelo Polje who coordinated their attack on Šahovići and Pavino Polje on the 19 km wide frontline. There are different estimates of the number of victims. Some sources estimate 600, while some sources up to 900, all of them emphasizing that many women and children were among victims. Some sources estimate the number of victims to be 3,000. According to the official report, the massacre was committed by villagers from Polja village in Kolašin, members of the brotherhood of the murdered Bošković, who killed 120 Muslims and burned and robbed 45 houses.

The massacre was described by Milovan Đilas in the book Land without Justice, based on the testimony of his father Nikola, who participated in the massacre.

Aftermath 
Muslim notables and leaders from Šahovići who survived the massacre wrote a memorandum to King Alexander I. In the absence of appropriate reaction from Yugoslav government, all Muslims from Šahovići emigrated from their village, most of them to Bosnia and Herzegovina. Many Muslims from the area of Bijelo Polje fled the region and emigrated to Turkey.

References

Further reading 
 
 Alamanah, 45–46, ISSN 0354-5342, pages: 299–365, Podgorica, 2009

Anti-Muslim violence in Europe
Mass murder in 1924
Massacres in 1924
Persecution of Muslims by Christians
Bijelo Polje Municipality
Massacres in Yugoslavia
1924 in Yugoslavia
November 1924 events
Massacres of Muslims
History of Sandžak